Aria Guitars Co. is a Japanese manufacturer of musical instruments. The company, sited in the city of Nagoya, produces electric, acoustic and classical guitars, electric basses and ukuleles through its brands Laule'A, Mojo Gig Bags, Fiesta, José Antonio, Pignose and Kelii.

History 
Aria was formed in Japan in 1956 by Shiro Arai as "Arai & Co., Inc".

They began retailing acoustic guitars in 1960, although the company did not start manufacturing their own until 1964. Aria arranged for Matsumoku, the musical instrument maker, to build the guitars for them under contract. Arai and Matsumoku started building acoustic guitars in 1964, and then electric guitars in 1966, using Arai, Aria, Aria Diamond, Diamond, and much less frequently, Arita brand names. The Aria brandname was changed to Aria Pro II in late 1975, though this has been used mostly (but not exclusively) for electric guitars and basses. All guitars were made in Japan until February 1987, when production of less expensive models (Magna MAB/MAC and Integra IGB series) was switched to Korea (Samick-factory production actually started as early as May 1986).

In the mid-1990s a few models (including the Fender Stratocaster-inspired Fullerton series guitars and the Steve Bailey 6-string fretless signature bass) were made in the United States.

Gallery

Aria Pro II

References

Bibliography

Further reading

External links

 
 The Guitars of Matsumoku - Includes scans of many original Aria catalogs
 Shiro Arai Interview NAMM Oral History Library (2006)

Guitar manufacturing companies
Manufacturing companies based in Nagoya
Manufacturing companies established in 1956
Japanese brands
Bass guitar manufacturing companies
Musical instrument manufacturing companies of Japan
1956 establishments in Japan